British Airways Flight 2069 was a scheduled passenger flight operated by British Airways between Gatwick, England and Jomo Kenyatta Airport, Nairobi, Kenya. At 05:00 on 29 December 2000, a mentally ill passenger stormed the cockpit and attempted to hijack the aircraft. The 747 stalled in the struggle. Captain William Hagan and his crew were able to apprehend the assailant while first officer Phil Watson regained control of the aircraft, bringing the situation under control.

Aircraft 
The aircraft involved was a Boeing 747-436, wearing the British Airways Ndebele Martha ethnic livery, registration G-BNLM, delivered to British Airways on 28 June 1990.

Incident 
At around 05:00 local time, the cockpit of a British Airways Boeing 747-400 on a scheduled flight from Gatwick to Jomo Kenyatta Airport was stormed by a mentally unstable Kenyan passenger named Paul Mukonyi. Attacking First Officer Phil Watson over the controls, Mukonyi grabbed the yoke, and tried to execute a route change. As Mukonyi and Watson fought for the controls, the struggle was joined by Captain Hagan who had gone for a rest break just before the attack. Two passengers (Henry Clarke Bynum and Gifford Murrell Shaw, both from Sumter, South Carolina, U.S.) sitting in the upper deck were able to get into the cockpit to assist, despite the extreme manoeuvres, and helped to remove Mukonyi from the yoke and get him out of the cockpit. Two Flight Attendants ran into the cockpit to assist them. First Officer Watson was now able to regain control, and return the aircraft to level flight. Afterwards, Captain Hagan made an announcement on the PA to reassure the passengers and the flight continued without further incident. Violent pitch changes during the incident were responsible for minor injuries among four passengers; one of the cabin crew broke her ankle. After landing in Nairobi, Mukonyi was immediately transferred to the authorities. The actions right after the apprehension were recorded on amateur video by the son of English musician Bryan Ferry; both were passengers on the flight. It was later found that Mukonyi was in fear of being followed, and was trying to kill those whom he deemed to be a threat, in this case the passengers and crew on the flight.

Aftermath
Captain William Hagan and First Officers Phil Watson and Richard Webb were awarded a Polaris Award in 2001. Hagan was also given the Royal Association for Disability and Rehabilitation (RADAR) People of the Year award.

A group of 16 American passengers settled a multimillion-dollar lawsuit against British Airways. British passengers were offered compensation of £2,000 and a free ticket each. The actual compensation package from BA for British passengers included the cash amount of £2,000, free attendance on a "Fear of Flying" course at Birmingham airport, and a free ticket to anywhere in the world on the BA network. In 2013 a small group of British passengers attempted to bring a lawsuit against BA, but a legal case could not be made and their efforts came to nothing.

British Airways no longer operates this route; it now flies from Heathrow instead. British Airways has kept the flight number in use, however, although  it is used for the London Gatwick – Mauritius route.

G-BNLM remained within the British Airways fleet until end of 2013 when it was withdrawn from service and was subsequently stored at Southern California Logistics Airport. It was scrapped in 2018.

See also 
Other similar Boeing 747 hijacking incidents
 All Nippon Airways Flight 61
 All Nippon Airways Flight 857

Notes

References 

Aircraft hijackings
Aviation accidents and incidents in 2000
Accidents and incidents involving the Boeing 747
Aviation accidents and incidents in Sudan
2069
2000 in Sudan
December 2000 events in Africa
2000 disasters in Sudan